Cha-cha-chá is a 1998 Spanish madcap comedy film directed by Antonio del Real. It stars Eduardo Noriega, Ana Álvarez, María Adánez and Jorge Sanz.

Plot 
María is in a relationship with Pablo, whom longtime María's friend Lucía gets infatuated with after sleeping one night with him. Lucía enlists the services of Antonio, a lower-class wannabe male model, to seduce María "away" from Pablo.

Cast

Production 
The screenplay was penned by Fernando León and Carlos Asorey alongside Antonio del Real. The film was produced by Sogetel in collaboration with Tele 5, and it also had participation of Canal+. Juan Amorós was responsible for the cinematography whereas Pablo Miyar was responsible for the music and Miguel Angel Santamaría for film editing. César Benítez took over production duties.

Release 
The film received a pre-screening in Bilbao. Distributed by Sogepaq, it was theatrically released on 10 July 1998. The film proved to be one of the biggest hits in the Spanish box office in 1998. As of November 1998, it had grossed around 285 million ₧, good for a third position in the ranking of Spanish films up to that point.

Reception 
Jonathan Holland of Variety deemed the "swiftly paced but largely routine" Antonio del Real's film to be a "by-the-book relationships movie about twentysomething love".

See also 
 List of Spanish films of 1998

References

Bibliography
 

1998 comedy films
Spanish comedy films
1990s Spanish-language films
1990s Spanish films